Virgil Breetveld (born 10 July 1967) is a Dutch football coach and former professional player.

Career
Born in Rotterdam, Breetveld played youth football for Steeds Hoger and Germinal Schiebroek, before signing for Feyenoord at the age of 17. Breetveld had not considered a professional football career, but was encouraged to pursue it by his coach Dick Beek, who himself had been a professional player. He made his debut for the first-team in April 1988. He later played for SVV, Dordrecht, De Graafschap, Excelsior and Fortuna Düsseldorf. He was top scorer of the Eerste Divisie in the 1994–95 season. He retired from professional football in November 2000.

After retiring as a player, Breetveld worked as a broker and let holiday apartments in Brazil. He was also manager of amateur side SC Reeland from 2003 to 2005, as well as EBOH and Wieldrecht.

He became an assistant manager at Dordrecht after signing a one-year contract in May 2011, combining his role there with his position as manager of Wieldrecht, and working 6 days a week in both roles. He signed a contract extension with Dordrecht in April 2012. He left his role with Dordrecht in 2013, and in September 2014 was working as manager of amateur team SteDoCo. In May 2017, Breetveld finished his employment at Stedoco. In the summer of 2017 he was appointed coach of the Sunday and Saturday first squads of Ido's Football Club.

References

1967 births
Living people
Dutch footballers
Feyenoord players
SV SVV players
FC Dordrecht players
De Graafschap players
Excelsior Rotterdam players
Fortuna Düsseldorf players
Eredivisie players
Eerste Divisie players
Association football forwards
Dutch expatriate footballers
Dutch expatriate sportspeople in Germany
Expatriate footballers in Germany
Dutch football managers
Footballers from Rotterdam
Ido's Football Club managers
SC Emma managers
EBOH managers